Blevins Gap Nature Preserve is a nature preserve in southern Huntsville, Alabama. It measures  in total and contains over 12 miles of trails within its borders. Cecil Ashburn Drive splits the preserve into two parts. The northern section measures  with 4.5 miles of trails, a rocky incline, and waterfalls. The southern portion measures the remaining  and contains 8 miles of woodland trails.

The trail system was designated as a National Recreation Trail in 2012.

History 
The preserve contains the southernmost remnant of the "Spacewalk Trail", which was constructed by Boy Scouts in the 1960s and ran from Monte Sano State Park to the southern edge of Green Mountain. The northern portion of the preserve, donated in 1988, was the first piece of land ever donated to a land trust in Alabama. The Stevenson Trail and the Fanning Trail, both located within this northern portion, are named after the original donors.

Flora and fauna 
Armadillos, bobcats, coyotes, deer, foxes, opossums, raccoons, and turkeys live in the preserve. Plant species include the Alabama snow-wreath, the American smoketree, and the yellow's lady slipper, in addition to the endangered Morefield's leather flower and Price's potato-bean.

References

External links
Map of the preserve

Protected areas of Madison County, Alabama
Tourist attractions in Huntsville, Alabama
Parks in Huntsville, Alabama
Hiking trails in Alabama
Mountain biking venues in Alabama
National Recreation Trails in Alabama